3C 390.3 is a broad-line radio galaxy located in the constellation Draco. It is also a Seyfert 1 galaxy which is an X-ray source.

References

External links
 Simbad
 3CRR atlas: 3C390.3

Radio galaxies
390.3
Draco (constellation)